Black Run Creek is a  long first order tributary to Dutch Buffalo Creek in Cabarrus County, North Carolina.

Course
Black Run Creek rises about 4 miles northeast of Watts Crossroads, North Carolina, and then follows a southerly course to join Dutch Buffalo Creek about 2 miles north of Mount Pleasant.

Watershed
Black Run Creek drains  of area, receives about 47.1 in/year of precipitation, has a wetness index of 433.00, and is about 43% forested.

References

Rivers of North Carolina
Rivers of Cabarrus County, North Carolina